Messidor is month in the French revolutionary calendar

Messidor can also refer to:

 Messidor (opera), 1897 opera by Alfred Bruneau
 Messidor (film), 1979 film directed by Alain Tanner